William Hawes (18 March 1620 - 12 September 1659)  was an English  academic.

Dobson was  educated at Trinity College, Oxford, becoming a Fellow in 1642. He was  President of Trinity from 1658 until his death. He is buried in the churchyard at Garsington.

References

1620 births
1659 deaths
Alumni of Trinity College, Oxford
Fellows of Trinity College, Oxford
Presidents of Trinity College, Oxford